Sir Oliver Mowat  (July 22, 1820 – April 19, 1903) was a Canadian lawyer, politician, and Ontario Liberal Party leader. He served for nearly 24 years as the third premier of Ontario. He was the eighth lieutenant governor of Ontario and one of the Fathers of Confederation. He is best known for defending successfully the constitutional rights of the provinces in the face of the centralizing tendency of the national government as represented by his longtime Conservative adversary, John A. Macdonald. This longevity and power was due to his maneuvering to build a political base around Liberals, Catholics, trade unions, and anti-French-Canadian sentiment.

Early years
Mowat was born in Kingston, Upper Canada (now Ontario), to John Mowat and Helen Levack, Scottish Presbyterians who both emigrated from Caithness, Scotland. As a youth, he had taken up arms with the loyalists during the Upper Canada Rebellion of 1837, which suggested a conservative inclination in politics. But he instead joined the Reformers.

Marriage, family, and legal success
Mowat was called to the bar of Upper Canada on November 5, 1841. In 1846, he married Jane Ewart, a daughter of John Ewart of Toronto. Mowat and his wife had three sons and four daughters. In 1856 Mowat was appointed Queen's Counsel.

He was known to be a tenacious legal practitioner, with two of his cases being upheld by the Judicial Committee of the Privy Council. In the 1858 case Bowes v. City of Toronto, John George Bowes (previously mayor of Toronto) was successfully sued for recovery of the share of the profit he was suspected to have made in collaboration with co-premier Francis Hincks out of a speculation in city debentures. Afterwards, Mowat admitted, "I cannot speak with much force unless I have an opponent, and things are said by others which I do not altogether coincide with."

Political career before Confederation

Mowat first entered politics as an alderman of the City of Toronto in 1857. From there, he became a member of the Legislative Assembly of the Province of Canada for South Ontario. As a member of the Assembly from 1858 to 1867, he was closely associated with George Brown. Mowat served as Provincial Secretary (1858) and Postmaster-General (1863–1864) in the pre-Confederation governments of George Brown and John Sandfield Macdonald for the Liberal Party of Canada.

Mowat was a member of the Great Coalition government of 1864 and was a representative at that year's Quebec Conference, where he helped work out the division of powers between the federal and provincial governments. On November 14, 1864, he was appointed to the judiciary as Vice-Chancellor of the Court of Chancery of Upper Canada, He held this position until he was appointed premier on October 25, 1872. One of the more notable cases during his time on the Court was Dickson v Burnham in 1868, whose underlying jurisprudence would be altered during his later time as Premier, with the passage of the Rivers and Streams Act, 1884.

Premier and Attorney-General of Ontario
Mowat served as provincial member for the riding of Oxford North, about 150 km west of Toronto, for his entire term as premier.

As premier in the 1880s a series of disputes with the Dominion arose over Provincial boundaries, jurisdiction over liquor licenses, trade and commerce, rivers and streams, timber, mineral rights and other matters. In 1890, it was said:

These court battles resulted in a weakening of the power of the federal government in provincial matters. Although Macdonald had dismissed him as "Blake's jackal", Mowat's battles with the federal government greatly decentralized Canada, giving the provinces far more power than Macdonald had intended.

He also served as his own Attorney-General concurrently with his service as Premier, and introduced reforms such as the secret ballot in elections, and the extension of suffrage beyond property owners. He also extended laws regulating liquor and consolidated the laws relating to the municipal level of government. His policies, particularly regarding liquor regulation and separate schools, routinely drew criticism from political conservatives, including the Orange Lodge and its associated newspaper, The Sentinel.

The boundary between Ontario and Manitoba became a hotly contested matter, with the federal government attempting to extend Manitoba's jurisdiction eastward to the Great Lakes, into the areas that Ontario claimed. In 1882, Premier Mowat threatened to pull Ontario from Confederation over the issue. Mowat sent police into the disputed territory to assert Ontario's claims, while Manitoba (at the behest of the national government) did the same. The Judicial Committee of the Privy Council in Britain, serving as Canada's highest appeal court, repeatedly issued rulings taking the side of provincial rights.  These decisions would to some extent neutralize the power of the central government, creating a more decentralized federation.  John Ibbitson writes that by 1914:
Confederation had evolved into a creation beyond John A. Macdonald's worst nightmare.  Powerful, independent provinces, sovereign within their own spheres, manipulated the rights of property, levied their own taxes—even income taxes, in a few cases—exploited their natural resources, and managed schools, hospitals, and relief for the poor, while a weak and ineffectual central government presided over not much of anything in the drab little capital on the banks of the Ottawa.

George William Ross praised Mowat's ability to read the public mind, and John Stephen Willison remarked that his political genius rose from "the fact that for so long he had a generous support from the liquor interest and a still more generous support from Prohibitionists".

His government was moderate and attempted to cut across divisions in the province between Roman Catholics and Protestants as well as between country and city. He also oversaw the northward expansion of Ontario's boundaries and the development of its natural resources, as well as the emergence of the province into the economic powerhouse of Canada.

Mowat's nearly 24 years as premier of Ontario remains the longest consecutive service by any premier in Ontario history, and is the third longest by any premier in Canada, behind only George Henry Murray of Nova Scotia and Ernest Manning of Alberta.

Federal level

In 1896, the leader of the opposition, Wilfrid Laurier, convinced Mowat to enter federal politics. It was thought that the combination of a French Canadian (Laurier) and the prestige of Oliver Mowat in Ontario would be a winning ticket for the Liberal party. The slogan was "Laurier, Mowat and Victory". Victory was won, and Mowat became Minister of Justice and Senator.

In 1897, he was appointed the eighth Lieutenant Governor of Ontario and served until his death in office in 1903. He is buried in Mount Pleasant Cemetery, Toronto.

Macdonald and Mowat in power
The two former Kingston law partners, Macdonald as prime minister in Ottawa and Mowat as premier in Toronto, led their respective governments during the same era for a total of 14 years. Mowat was premier for just under 24 years.

Family
Mowat's daughter, Jane Helen Mowat, married Charles Robert Webster Biggar, who wrote a two-volume biography of Mowat in 1905. Their son Oliver Mowat Biggar became Canada's first Chief Electoral Officer. Sir Oliver Mowat's son Frederick Mowat was the grandfather of the diabetologist Andrew Almon Fletcher.

Sir Oliver Mowat was also the great-granduncle of the Canadian author, Farley Mowat.

Other achievements

Mowat was knighted in 1892, increasing his importance in Canada.

Mowat was himself the author of two small books in the field of Christian apologetics:

 
 

Mowat also documented his government's first 18 years of Ontario government (from 1872 to 1890) in an 1890 book.

Legacy

After his death, Wilfrid Laurier placed Mowat's policy of sectarian tolerance second in historical importance only to his role in giving Confederation its character as a federal compact. He credited Mowat with giving Ontario "a Government which can be cited as a model for all Governments: a Government which was honest, progressive, courageous, and tolerant".

By nature a secretive individual, he left instructions in his will that resulted in the destruction of nearly all his papers.

Mowat is honoured by a statue in Queen's Park. Mowat Avenue in Kingston is named in his honour.

Mowat is the inspiration for the naming of The Mowat Centre, an independent Canadian public policy think tank associated with the School of Public Policy & Governance at the University of Toronto.

The Sir Oliver Mowat Collegiate Institute in Toronto was named in his honour.

Queen's University organized a two-day historical colloquium in 1970 to celebrate the 150th anniversary of Mowat's birth.

Mowat was portrayed by David Onley (the 28th Lieutenant-Governor of Ontario) in the Canadian TV series Murdoch Mysteries in 2013 in the episode "The Ghost of Queen's Park."

Mowat was portrayed by Kingston actor Patrick Downes, in 2015, in Kingston-based Salon Theatre's stage productions featuring the life of John A. Macdonald, staged during the Bicentennial celebrations of Macdonald's birth.

The building where Mowat and Macdonald practiced law together in the 1830s, on the east side of Wellington Street between Princess and Brock Streets in Kingston, was renovated, restored, and expanded, from 2014–18, but has had its heritage elements preserved, insofar as possible, under direction from Kingston City Council. The building re-opened as the 'Kensington' in 2018, and now features, on its street level, an alley portraying historical and heritage aspects of its past, along with the Macdonald-Mowat relationship.

References

Further reading

Articles

 
 
 
 
 
 
 
 
 , a short scholarly biography

Books (historical)

 
 
 
 
 
 

Books (general)

External links
 
 
 
 Oliver Mowat family fonds, Archives of Ontario
 
 
 Ontario Plaques – Sir Oliver Mowat
 Toronto Plaques – The Macdonald-Mowat House 1872 
 The Mowat Centre website
Oliver Mowat-Biography  — Canada history
Oliver Mowat — Marianopolis
 
Sir Oliver Mowat (book) — JSTOR
Oliver Mowat — Lieutenant governors of Ontario
Oliver Mowat — City of Montreal
Oliver Mowat — Canada Government
Oliver Mowat-Article Premiers of Ontario — The Canadian Encyclopedia
Oliver Mowat — Access Genealogy

1820 births
1903 deaths
Attorneys General of Ontario
Lawyers in Ontario
Canadian King's Counsel
Canadian Presbyterians
Canadian people of Scottish descent
Canadian senators from Ontario
Canadian male non-fiction writers
Canadian memoirists
Fathers of Confederation
Canadian Knights Grand Cross of the Order of St Michael and St George
Leaders of the Ontario Liberal Party
Liberal Party of Canada senators
Lieutenant Governors of Ontario
Members of the Legislative Assembly of the Province of Canada from Canada West
Members of the King's Privy Council for Canada
Premiers of Ontario
Persons of National Historic Significance (Canada)
Oliver
Upper Canada Rebellion people
Writers from Kingston, Ontario
19th-century Canadian non-fiction writers
19th-century Canadian male writers
19th-century Canadian lawyers
19th-century memoirists